= Samuel Jarvis (army officer) =

Captain Samuel Jarvis (c. 1698–1779) was a British-American soldier in Connecticut.

Jarvis was born in Connecticut in about 1698 to William Jarvis (British) (1672–1740) and Esther Wickes (1676–1740). His father had left England with his parents (Stephen Jarvis (1625–1693) and Mary Porter (1629–1693) in the 17th century to live in America.

His son Samuel was their only child. Jarvis died in Connecticut in 1779. He is connected to the famous Jarvis family of Toronto.
